The Syro-Malabar Catholic Eparchy of Thamarassery is an Eastern Catholic eparchy in India, under the Syro-Malabar Catholic Church. It was created on 28 April 1986. On Monday, 18 January 2010, the Synod of Bishops of the Syro-Malabar Church, meeting at Mt. St. Thomas (with the assent of the Holy See) appointed Mar Remigiose Inchananiyil, secretary and chancellor of Thamarassery, and judge of the major archiepiscopal tribunal, as the new bishop. Mar Paul Chittilapilly was the bishop emeritus of the diocese and he died on 6th September 2020. Mar Remigius Inchananiyil was consecrated on 8 April 2010. The bishop's House is situated near chavara hospital thamarassery. 

The Syro-Malabar Church is governed by the Major Archbishop of Erankulam-Angamaly and the synod of all bishops of the sui iuris Church, both within and outside of India. 

Syro-Malabar Eparchy of Thamarassery comes under the Metropolitan Province of Tellicherry. There are several important churches under the Eparchy of Thamarassery. The most prominent among them are St. Thomas Forane Church Koorachudu and Sacred Heart Forane Church Thiruvambady.

Foranes under Diocese of Thamarassery

 Karuvarakundu Holy Family Church (1972)
 Kodenchery St.Mary's Church (1949)
 Koorachundu St. Thomas Church (1947)
 Malappuram St. Thomas Church (2005)
 Marudonkara St.Mary's Church (1939)
 Paroppady St. Antony's Church (1969)
 Perinthalamanna St. Alphonsa's Church (1995)
 Thamarassery Mary Matha Cathedral Church (1984)
 Thiruvambady Sacred Heart Church (1944)
 Thottumukkom St. Thomas Church (1960)
 Vilangad St. Georges Church (1968)
  
Under this 11 Foranes there are 118 parishes, 14 stations also there. Around 30,000 families & 1.30 lakhs members are there total in Diocese.

References

Bibliography
P.T. SEBASTIAN, The Sociology of Christian Migration to Malabar 1930 - 1980, (thesis), University of Calicut, Kozhikode-Kerala 2002.

External links
 Syro-Malabar Catholic Diocese of Thamarassery at Catholic-Hierarchy
 
 
 

Eastern Catholic dioceses in India
Syro-Malabar Catholic dioceses
Archdiocese of Tellicherry
Christian organizations established in 1986
Roman Catholic dioceses and prelatures established in the 20th century
1986 establishments in Kerala
Dioceses in Kerala